Ptak is a Polish surname (meaning "bird"), and may refer to:

 Aleksander Ptak (born 1977), Polish footballer
 Bernard Ptak (born 1954), Polish politician
 Claire Ptak, British baker
 Franciszek Ptak (1859-1936), Polish politician
 Krzysztof Ptak (born 1954), Polish cinematographer
 Robt Ptak (born 1970), American guitarist and musician
 Włodzimierz Ptak (1928-2019), Polish immunologist

See also
 

Polish-language surnames